Poillé-sur-Vègre is a commune in the Sarthe department in the region of Pays de la Loire in north-western France.

Geography
The village lies in the middle of the commune, on the right bank of the Vègre, which forms part of the commune's north-eastern and south-eastern borders.

See also
Communes of the Sarthe department

References

External links

 Town council website 

Communes of Sarthe